Arnaldo Ortelli (5 August 1913 – 27 February 1986) was a Swiss footballer who was a squad member for Switzerland in the 1934 FIFA World Cup. Despite this he had to wait until 1942 for his first and only cap. He also played for FC Lugano.

References

Swiss men's footballers
Switzerland international footballers
1934 FIFA World Cup players
Association football defenders
FC Lugano players
1913 births
1986 deaths